Results from the 1953 Formula Libre Buenos Aires Grand Prix, held on February 1, 1953, at the Autódromo Juan y Óscar Gálvez in Buenos Aires.

Classification

References

Buenos Aires Grand Prix
Buenos Aires Grand Prix
Buenos Aires Grand Prix